Tomrair (died 848) was a ninth-century Viking active in Ireland. He is one of the first Vikings recorded by Irish sources. Tomrair is reported to have been killed at the Battle of Sciath Nechtain, a conflict in which twelve hundred Vikings were slain, battling the combined forces of Ólchobar mac Cináeda, King of Munster and Lorcán mac Cellaig, King of Leinster, in 848.

Surviving accounts of Tomrair's demise accord him the Gaelic title , making him the first earl noted by Irish sources. In fact,  is the first Nordic loanword on record.

The context of Tomrair's fall is likewise uncertain. In the years immediately after this, a group of Vikings called  are noted to have battled another group called . In the years that followed, three Vikings appear to have shared the kingship of Dublin: Amlaíb, Ímar, and Auisle. These men could well have been related to each other, and there is reason to suspect that Tomrair was yet another relation as well.

The year of Tomrair's death is remarkable in the fact that the Irish won several battles against the Vikings. Tomrair's eminent standing as a Viking  could indicate that it was his defeat and death that is referred to by a Frankish annal in 848. It is possible that a hoard of Carolingian coins, unearthed at Mullaghboden in the nineteenth century, may have been deposited in the context of Tomrair's defeat. These coins appear to have been looted from Aquitaine only a few years before by Vikings from Vestfold.

Tomrair may be associated with the "ring of Tomar", an object that was looted from Dublin in 994, along with the "sword of Carlus". These objects appear to have formed part of the royal insignia of Dublin, and may have been symbols of the Uí Ímair dynasty descended from Ímar. At about the same time that the ring appears on record, the Dubliners are described in Irish poetry as the "race of Tomar" and "Tomar's nobles". If these designations are not references to Þór, a Nordic deity, they may refer to Tomrair.

Attestations and death

Tomrair died in 848. His death is reported by the eleventh–fourteenth-century Annals of Inisfallen, the seventeenth-century Annals of the Four Masters, the fifteenth–sixteenth-century  Annals of Ulster, and the twelfth-century Chronicon Scotorum. Tomrair's troops were pitted against the combined forces of two of the most powerful provincial kings of Ireland: Ólchobar mac Cináeda, King of Munster (died 851) and Lorcán mac Cellaig, King of Leinster (fl. 848).

The King of Laithlind may be identical to the King of the Foreigners attested by the Irish annals in the following year. According to various annalistic accounts, the said king sent a fleet of one hundred and forty ships overseas to contend with Vikings already settled in Ireland.

Context

Familial relations and rank

Thereafter, Dublin was evidently ruled by three kings: Amlaíb, Ímar (died 973), and Auisle (died 867). There is reason to suspect that the three were brothers. The eleventh-century Fragmentary Annals of Ireland certainly claims that the three were brothers, and specifically identifies the father of Amlaíb and Ímar as a man named Gofraid.

The fact that several of Ímar's apparent descendants—the Uí Ímair—repeatedly bore forms of the personal names Albdann, Amlaíb, Auisle, and Ímar, could further be evidence of shared kinship. If Ímar is identical to Ingware (died 869/870?)—a like-named leader of the Viking Great Army in Anglo-Saxon England—other brothers may include Albdann (died 877), and an unidentified Viking commander slain against the West Saxons in 878. The latter two are certainly described as Ingware's brothers by the ninth- to twelfth-century Anglo-Saxon Chronicle.

Another brother could have been Tomrair himself. The Fragmentary Annals of Ireland assigns Ímar the following pedigree: "". Although this pedigree may not be accurate, Gofraid, the alleged father of Amlaíb and Ímar, may well have been an historical figure. This man could be identical to the like-named King of  whose death is recorded by the Fragmentary Annals of Ireland. He is one of the earliest Vikings named by Irish sources.

The earliest instance of the Gaelic title  (later ) is the account of Tomrair's demise reported by the Annals of Ulster. The term itself, meaning "earl", is derived from the Old Norse , and is the first Nordic loanword on record in Old Irish. The Scandinavian title of jarl referred to a king's subordinate or deputy, a man who held some form of vice-regal authority over a particular region.

The precise meaning of this Gaelic title—forms of which are accorded to Tomrair by the Annals of the Four Masters, the Annals of Ulster, the Chronicle of Ireland, and Chronicon Scotorum—is uncertain. One possibility is that it means "awaited one of a king", "heir", "heir designate", "heir-designate", "designated successor", "heir apparent". "heir-apparent of a king", "king designate", or "royal heir". Another possibility is that it means "deputy", "military second-in-command", "representative", "second in command to a king", "second in rank or power", "second of a king", or "second to a king".

The record of Tomrair's demise is the first notice of the term  utilised by the Irish annals. The location of the ninth-century  is uncertain. One possibility is that forms of the word refer to a Viking-controlled region of Scotland, the Northern Isles, the Western Isles, and the Isle of Man. Another possibility is that the term refers to Norway, or else a region within Norway. In later centuries, forms of the term  came to be replaced by forms of Lochlainn. It is unknown if the two terms originally had different meanings or if they were merely conflated.

The annal-entries of 848–853 can be interpreted in a variety of ways. In either case, it is possible that the terms  and  refer to the order of arrival.

Literally, the former translates as "Dark Foreigners", whilst the latter translates as "Fair Foreigners". Whilst it is possible that the ninth-century forms of these terms refer to separate ethnicities or cultural groups—such as Danes and Norwegians respectively—the terms may instead refer to political power blocs specific to Britain and Ireland.

If the accounts of Tomrair, Amlaíb, and the Vikings of  refer to royal Norwegian intervention in Ireland, it is conceivable that had Tomrair held authority in Dublin, and that the King of  moved to regain control of the region after his demise. The subsequent actions of the Vikings of  may have been undertaken in the specific context of recovering control of an important node in their trade network. As such, there is reason to suspect that Viking trading centres such as Dublin were founded by powers in Scandinavia, as opposed to enterprising independent Vikings oversea. Such conflict between competing Danish and Norwegian interests in the Irish Sea region could also represent an early phase in the eventual consolidation of royal power in Norway.

The "ring of Tomar"

In time, the Uí Ímair possessed royal power in the Irish Sea region for centuries. There is reason to suspect that this dynasty reinforced its right to rule by way of royal insignia specifically recorded by the Irish annals. For example, when Dublin was invaded by Máel Sechnaill mac Domnaill, King of Mide (died 1022) in 994, the seventeenth-century Annals of Clonmacnoise, the Annals of the Four Masters, the fourteenth-century Annals of Tigernach, and Chronicon Scotorum, report that the Irish seized from the Dubliners the "sword of Carlus" and the "ring of Tomar". In 1029, when Mathgamain ua Riagáin is reported to have taken hostage Amlaíb, son of Sitriuc mac Amlaíb, King of Dublin, Mathgamain exacted a remarkable ransom that included the "sword of Carlus". The sword is last noted in 1058, when it was reported in the possession of Diarmait mac Maíl na mBó (died 1072), a man otherwise known to have brought both Dublin and the Isle of Man under his authority by 1060.

The various accounts of the sword and ring reveal that the objects were powerful ceremonial symbols, and important parts of Dublin's royal regalia. Swords and hammers are depicted upon some Anglo-Scandinavian coins. One possibility is that these symbols are identical to the "ring of Tomar" and "sword of Carlus", and are thus symbols of the Uí Ímair. The identities of Carlus and Tomar are nevertheless uncertain. The Gaelic  may be a form of the Old Norse , the name of a divine figure in Nordic mythology. The former is also a variant of the personal name Tomrair, which is in turn a Gaelicised form of the Old Norse personal name , a name itself derived from Þór.

On one hand, the Tomar of the ring may be the god Þór. It is possible that the eponym of the ring is identical to that of Caill Tomair ("The Wood of Tomar"), a forest seemingly situated north of Dublin, attested in the late tenth century by the Annals of Inisfallen, the Annals of Tigernach, the twelfth-century Cogad Gáedel re Gallaib, and Chronicon Scotorum. The wood has been specifically associated with Þór, and regarded to have been a place of pagan significance in Viking Age Ireland. If the ring was indeed a reference to a heathen cult object, the fact that only the sword is attested in the tenth century could indicate that an association between the dynasty and a pagan item was undesirable.

If the ring does not specifically refer to a pagan god, it could well refer to Tomrair himself. Although Irish sources reveal that at least three later Vikings bore the same name, Tomrair was clearly the most eminent of these individuals. Certain notices by the Annals of the Four Masters and the twelfth-century Lebor na Cert—specifically fragments of poetry coeval with the records of the sword and ring—respectively describe the Dubliners as the "race of Tomar" and "Tomar's nobles". If these specific instances do not refer to the pagan deity, it is possible that they refer to Tomrair himself, and reveal that his memory was held in high esteem by the ruling dynasty of Dublin.

The eponym behind the "sword of Carlus" is likewise uncertain. One possibility is that the name refers to the Frankish emperor Charlemagne. Another possibility is that Carlus is identical to Carlus mac Cuinn meic Donnchada (died 960). Not only does this man appear to have been the grandson of a High King of Ireland, but he was also slain in Dublin. However, there may be a more likely candidate. Ímar's associate, Amlaíb, is known to have had two sons: one was Carlus, a man slain in 868; another was Oistin, a man slain by the  commander Albdann, in 875. The latter Carlus could well be the eponym behind the "sword of Carlus". As such, Tomrair's certain connection with this man's father could be evidence that Tomrair is indeed the eponym behind the "ring of Tomar".

Epilogue

Irish sources report that the Vikings suffered several remarkable defeats to the Irish in 848. For example, the record of a victory by Máel Sechnaill mac Máele Ruanaid, with seven hundred Viking dead; the notice of Tomrair's defeat against Ólchobar and Lorcán, with twelve hundred Viking dead; the record of a victory by Tigernach mac Fócartai, with another twelve hundred (or twelve score) Vikings slain; and the record of Vikings defeated by the Eóganacht Chaisil, with five hundred Vikings killed.

News of Irish successes are known to have reached the Frankish court in the following year, as the ninth-century Annales Bertiniani states that the Irish won a great victory against the Vikings, driving them out of their lands, and that the Irish sent an envoy to Charles II, King of the Franks (died 877), in an effort to negotiate an alliance and treaty with the Franks. Although any of the Irish victories of 848 could have inspired a Frankish chronicler to make note of the island, it could well have been Tomrair's eminent status—and his ultimate destruction—that was the true catalyst for this overseas annal-entry. In any case, there is a drastic decline in reported Viking attacks in Ireland after the 840s, and it is evident that the era of ninth-century massed Viking incursions was over for the Irish. By the 860s and 870s, however, the Vikings had turned their attention towards Anglo-Saxon England.

In 1871, a Viking Age hoard of at least eleven Carolingian coins was uncovered at Mullaghboden, near Ballymore Eustace. The hoard appears to have been originally deposited as early as about 847. This could mean that it was hidden by Vikings fleeing the Battle of Sciath Nechtain in 848. The hoard itself appears to have been composed of coins looted from Aquitaine only a few years previous, a haul possibly pillaged by the Viking fleet of  contemporaneously attested by the ninth–eleventh-century Annales Engolismenses. This force was evidently composed of men from Vestfold, a region of eastern Norway evidently under Danish overlordship during the ninth century.

Notes

Citations

References

Primary sources

Secondary sources

9th century in Ireland
9th-century rulers in Europe
848 deaths
Rulers of Lochlann
Viking rulers
9th-century Vikings